The 2017 season is Stallion Laguna's 1st season in the top flight of Philippines football.

Preseason and friendlies

Stallion Invitational Cup

Competitions

Philippines Football League

Regular season

Note:
 a The home stadium of the club is located in Bantay, Ilocos Sur, a nearby town of Vigan. For administrative and marketing purposes, the home city of Ilocos United is designated as "Vigan"
 b Because of the ongoing works in the Marikina Sports Complex, the team will play its first few league games at the Biñan Football Stadium and Rizal Memorial Stadium and will have to groundshare with Stallion Laguna and Meralco Manila, respectively.
 c Because of the unavailability of the Cebu City Sports Complex, the match was played instead in Rizal Memorial Stadium, Manila.

League squad

References

Stallion Laguna 2017
Stallion Laguna 2017